Football Hall of Fame Western Australia was formed in 1996 to promote, preserve and protect the history of soccer in Western Australia.

Hall of Legends

Hall of Champions

Hall of Merit for Players

Hall of Recognition

References

External links
 Football Hall of Fame Western Australian website

Soccer in Western Australia
Australian soccer trophies and awards
Halls of fame in Western Australia